The Stars in Their Courses is a collection of seventeen scientific essays by American writer Isaac Asimov. It is the eighth in a series of books collecting his essays from The Magazine of Fantasy & Science Fiction (May 1969 to September 1970). Doubleday & Company first published the collection in 1971.

Contents

Introduction
Part A: Astronomy
"The Stars in their Courses"
"The Lop-sided Sun"
"The Lunar Honor-roll"
"Worlds in Confusion"
Part B: Physics
"Two at a Time"
"On Throwing a Ball"
"The Man Who Massed the Earth"
"The Luxon Wall"
"Playing the Game"
"The Distance of Far"
Part C: Chemistry
"The Multiplying Elements"
"Bridging the Gaps"
"The Nobel Prize That Wasn't"
Part D: Sociology
"The Fateful Lightning"
"The Sin of the Scientist"
"The Power of Progression"
"My Planet, 'tis of Thee—"

External links
Asimovonline.com

1971 non-fiction books
Essay collections by Isaac Asimov
Works originally published in The Magazine of Fantasy & Science Fiction
Doubleday (publisher) books